Rosalba Forciniti (born 13 February 1986 in Cosenza) is an Italian Judoka.

Biography
She won the bronze medal in 52 kg category at the 2012 Summer Olympics, she is the first Calabrian woman ever to reach the podium at the Olympic Games.

Achievements

References

External links
 
 
 Athlete profile at CONI web site

Italian female judoka
Judoka at the 2012 Summer Olympics
Olympic judoka of Italy
Olympic bronze medalists for Italy
Olympic medalists in judo
Sportspeople from Cosenza
1986 births
Living people
Medalists at the 2012 Summer Olympics
Mediterranean Games silver medalists for Italy
Competitors at the 2009 Mediterranean Games
Mediterranean Games medalists in judo
Judoka of Centro Sportivo Carabinieri
21st-century Italian women